Fred Taylor Park is an association football ground based in Whenuapai, Auckland. It is the home ground of West Coast Rangers. It also is the former home to Waitakere City F.C. and Waitakere United before the clubs dissolved in 2020 and 2021 respectively.

History
In September 2022, FIFA announced that Fred Taylor Park was shortlisted to be a team base camp for the 2023 FIFA Women's World Cup. On 12 December 2022, Fred Taylor Park was announced as the training ground for Vietnam during the world cup.

References

External links
Fred Taylor Park at the Waitakere United website

Association football venues in New Zealand
Sports venues in Auckland
Association football in Auckland